Grapefruit mercaptan is the common name for a natural organic compound found in grapefruit.  It is a monoterpenoid that contains a thiol (also known as a mercaptan) functional group. Structurally a hydroxy group of terpineol is replaced by the thiol in grapefruit mercaptan, so it also called thioterpineol. Volatile thiols typically have very strong, often unpleasant odors that can be detected by humans in very low concentrations. Grapefruit mercaptan has a very potent, but not unpleasant, odor, and it is the chemical constituent primarily responsible for the aroma of grapefruit.  This characteristic aroma is a property of only the R enantiomer.

Pure grapefruit mercaptan, or citrus-derived oils rich in grapefruit mercaptan, are sometimes used in perfumery and the flavor industry to impart citrus aromas and flavors. However, both industries actively seek substitutes for grapefruit mercaptans for use as a grapefruit flavorant, since its decomposition products are often highly disagreeable to the human sense of smell.

The detection threshold for the (+)-(R) enantiomer of grapefruit mercaptan is 2×10−5 ppb, or equivalently a concentration of 2×10−14. This corresponds to being able to detect 2×10−5 mg in one metric ton of water - one of the lowest detection thresholds ever recorded for a naturally occurring compound.

See also
Nootkatone, another aroma compound in grapefruit
Terpineol, where a hydroxyl is in place of the thiol

References

Thiols
Flavors
Perfume ingredients
Monoterpenes
Cyclohexenes